Isnardo Guarco (Genoa, 1380 – Genoa, 1458) was an Italian politician, mercenary leader, plutocrat, and served as Doge of Genoa for one week.

See also 

 Republic of Genoa
 Doge of Genoa

References 

1380 births
1458 deaths
15th-century Doges of Genoa
15th-century condottieri